Melody Circus (stylized as MELODY CIRCUS) is LISA's third studio album, released on May 20, 2005. It contains covers of 1980s English songs.

Background information
Melody Circus is a covers album that was released a year after her last album, Gratitude, in May 2005.  The album debuted low on the Oricon Albums Charts at #71 and remained on the charts for five weeks, shifting 6,700 units. The album is a collection of acoustic covers by American artists who LISA has said she has enjoyed.

The album was released in both CD and CD+DVD editions, with the DVD housing every music video she had released up until the album's release, along with two of the songs she performed acoustically during her 2004 performance at Sumida Triphony Hall.

Her cover version of The Bangles' song "Eternal Flame" was used as the promotional song for Japan's release of the film Eternal Sunshine of the Spotless Mind. It was also placed on the Japanese edition of the film's official soundtrack.

Track listing

References

External links 
 LISA official discography
 Oricon Music Special
 HMV album release

2005 albums
LISA (Japanese musician, born 1974) albums
Avex Group albums
Covers albums